Der Tod fürs Vaterland is an ode by Friedrich Hölderlin which has been set to music by Walter Braunfels, Fritz Brandt, and Carl Gerhardt.

Lyrics

Background 
The verses are nurtured by revolutionary aspirations that emerged in Hölderlin's mind after the invasion of French troops in Southern Germany in 1796.
 
The first draft of the ode was called "Die Schlacht" (Battle) and illustrates Hölderlin's intentions:

Here, Hölderlin means the German Landesväter (Landesvater: father of the land), i.e. the princes, and criticizes the word and the concept as such positive terms were used in order to disguise their despotism and to keep their subjects unmündig.

For Hölderlin, the Vaterland was thus mainly a community that had to be defended by both foreign invasion and domestic tyrants, an idea based on the principles of the French Revolution, which he admired as he had written in 1792 to his sister when he told her that he "pray[s] for the French, the advocates of human rights".

The ode thus incites the German youth to start a revolutionary war of liberation: in the first two stanzas Hölderlin encourages the Jünglinge to fight the tyrannical mercenary armies of the princes that are better equipped but less motivated as they did not fight for their country but only for money. The "Vaterlandsgesängen" (patriotic paeans) he invokes are a reference to the Marseillaise which was very popular at that time, even outside France.

References 

German patriotic songs
German poems
Year of song unknown
Works by Friedrich Hölderlin
Compositions by Walter Braunfels